This is a list of Serbian historians, including area of expertise.

Čedomir Antić (born 1974), the modern history of Serbia
Lazar Arsenijević Batalaka (1793-1869), history of the Serbian revolution (1803-1813)
Dušan T. Bataković (1957–2017), the modern history of Serbia
Miloš Blagojević (1930–2012), medieval Serbia
Dimitrije Bogdanović (1930–1986), medieval Serbia and church history
Veselin Čajkanović (1881–1946), classical
Vladimir Ćorović (1885–1941), medieval Serbia and Bosnia
Sima Ćirković (1929–2009), medieval Serbia and Bosnia
Vladimir Dedijer (1914–1990), World War II
Ljubodrag Dimić (born 1956), history of Yugoslavia
Dimitrije Đorđević (1922–2009), modern Balkans
Milorad Ekmečić (1928–2015), the modern history of Serbia and Bosnia
Božidar Ferjančić (1929–1998), medieval Serbia and Byzantine Empire
Andra Gavrilović (1864–1929), literary history
Vojislav Korać (1924–2010), medieval architecture
Lazo M. Kostić (1897–1979), modern ethnology
Vasilije Krestić (born 1932), Serb-Croat relations and Yugoslavia
Svetislav Mandić (1921–2003), medieval Serbian culture
Smilja Marjanović-Dušanić (born 1963), medieval Serbia
Dejan Medaković (1922–2008), art
Čedomilj Mijatović (1842-1932), medieval Serbia
Rade Mihaljčić (1937–2020), medieval Serbia and Bosnia
Andrej Mitrović (1937–2013), 20th century
Stojan Novaković (1842–1915), medieval Serbia
George Ostrogorsky (1902–1976), Byzantine Empire
Stevan K. Pavlowitch (born 1933), modern Balkans
Branko Petranović (1927–1994), Yugoslavia
Dušan J. Popović (1894–1965), Habsburg Serbs
Miodrag Purković (1907–1976), medieval Serbia
Radivoj Radić (born 1954), Byzantine Empire
Svetozar Radojčić (1909–1978), medieval Serbia
Srđan Rudić (born 1968), medieval Serbia, Bosnia and Montenegro
Radovan Samardžić (1922–1994), medieval Serbia and Ragusa, Ottoman Empire
Dragoslav Srejović (1931–1996), archaeology
Stanoje Stanojević (1874–1937), medieval Serbia
Tibor Živković (1966–2013), medieval Balkans
Sima Lukin Lazić (1862-1904), first to write prehistory of Serbia
Jovan I. Deretić continues the work of Sima Lukin Lazić

See also
List of historians
Serbian historiography

Further reading
 

 
Historian
Serbia